Flags of Arab countries, territories, and organisations usually include the color green, which is a symbol of Islam as well as an emblem of purity, fertility and peace. Common colors in Arab flags are Pan-Arab colors (red, black, white and green); common symbols include stars, crescents and the Shahada.

Arab national flags

Old Arab national flags

Arab organizations

Other Arab territories

See also
 Pan-Arab colors

References 

  This article contains quotations from the CIA World Factbook, which is in the public domain.

Arab nationalist symbols
National flags
Lists and galleries of flags
Flags
Arab world
Africa
Eurasia